Allstate Arena is a multi-purpose arena in Rosemont, Illinois, United States. It is located near the intersection of Mannheim Road and Interstate 90, adjacent to the city limits of Chicago and O'Hare International Airport. The facility opened in 1980 as the Rosemont Horizon and seats 17,500 for basketball and 16,692 for ice hockey.

The arena is home to the Chicago Wolves of the American Hockey League (AHL) and has served as the home arena for a number of other professional and collegiate teams, most notably the DePaul Blue Demons from 1980 through 2017.

History
The Village of Rosemont issued $19 million in bonds to finance the cost of the arena with exclusive contracts with Araserv, the Ringling Bros. and Barnum & Bailey Circus, and MFG International.

On August 13, 1979, the uncompleted roof of the Rosemont Horizon collapsed, killing five construction workers and injuring 16 others.   The collapse was featured in the "Engineering Disasters" episode of Modern Marvels, first broadcast by The History Channel on April 20, 2006.

One distinctive feature of the Allstate Arena is its timber roof, designed to muffle the sounds of any passing aircraft descending into and taking off from O'Hare International Airport.

The facility, originally named Rosemont Horizon, was intended to be the home of the Chicago Horizons of the Major Indoor Soccer League (MISL) and was home of the 1980–1981 season but the franchise folded in 1982. It was also intended to be the home of the WHA's Chicago Cougars, but the team folded in 1975, three years before the arena broke ground. The first concert held at the Horizon was Fleetwood Mac on May 15, 1980, as they cut a red ribbon on the stage during the opening of the show.

The Rosemont Horizon was featured in many music videos, including the 1985 music video "Big City Nights" by Scorpions.

Insurance company Allstate signed a 10-year contract worth more than $10 million on June 9, 1999, to acquire naming rights to the arena and renovate it.

On December 29, 2002, Creed gave a concert at the arena with lead singer Scott Stapp obnoxiously high and drunk. After barely performing and mumbling incoherently through the first songs, he fell asleep onstage for a few minutes and the show ended early. This performance led four concertgoers to sue the band for over $2 million, and contributed to Creed's breakup.

On December 14, 2003, the floor at the Allstate Arena was named "Ray and Marge Meyer Court" in honor of Basketball Hall of Famer Ray Meyer and his wife. Meyer coached DePaul's men's team for 42 seasons and is the school's all-time winningest coach.

Events

Sports
Allstate Arena was the home of DePaul University men's basketball team until the end of the 2016–17 season. The Blue Demons previously played on campus at Alumni Hall. That gym has since been replaced with McGrath-Phillips Arena, home to the women's basketball program through that team's 2016–17 season. The building hosted the NCAA basketball tournament three times: the 1987 and 1993 Midwest Regional first and second-round games, and the 2005 Chicago Regional Finals.

The Arena Football League also has a long history with Allstate Arena. The Horizon hosted an arena football test game in 1987 and the Chicago Bruisers were an original Arena Football League team when the league began in 1987. The Bruisers played from 1987 to 1989, and hosted ArenaBowl II in Rosemont, losing to the Detroit Drive, 24–13. In 2001, Arena Football returned to the arena with the Chicago Rush. The Rush increased its home attendance each year from 2001 to 2008, and from 2004 to 2008 averaged between 14,000 and 16,000 fans per game. The Rush's highest home attendance is 16,391 on June 23, 2007, against the Kansas City Brigade. After the AFL restructured in 2009, the Rush returned to the Arena Football League.

On October 25, 2008, the Allstate Arena hosted UFC 90, the first Ultimate Fighting Championship event in the state of Illinois.

The Professional Bull Riders brought their Built Ford Tough Series tour for events in 2006 and 2008. As of 2018, the tour has held the Chicago Invitational event here every year since 2010. PBR plans to continue this event in Chicago in 2019.

The arena is where the monster truck racing track style known as "Chicago-style" was created.

The Chicago Sky of the WNBA announced on August 17, 2009, that the team reached a multi-year lease with the arena.

In 1989, Loyola Ramblers men's basketball became tenants of the arena, moving from the International Amphitheatre. The team played its home games at the Rosemont Horizon during their 1989–90, 1990–91, 1991–92, 1992–93, and 1993–94 seasons before moving to a renovated Alumni Gym on their campus.

During the 2012-13 NHL lockout, Allstate Arena was the site of the Champs for Charity Hockey Game where current and former Chicago Blackhawks hosted fellow NHLers in front of 10,000+ fans.

DePaul left the arena after the 2016–17 season for the new Wintrust Arena in Chicago, leaving the arena without a permanent college basketball tenant, although Northwestern University moved its men's home basketball games to the arena temporarily for the 2017–18 season before returning to its on-campus home at Welsh–Ryan Arena in Evanston, after a full-academic-year renovation of that facility.

Championships and playoffs

AFL ArenaBowl II
AHL Calder Cup
Qualifier (Western Conference): 2002
Western Conference Quarterfinals : 2002, 2003 West Division Semifinals 2004, 2005, 2007, 2008, 2010 Western Conference Quarterfinals: 2012, 2014, 2015
Western Conference Semifinals: 2002, 2003 West Division Finals: 2004, 2005, 2007, 2008, 2010 Western Conference Semifinals: 2014
Western Conference Finals: 2002, 2005, 2007, 2008
Calder Cup Finals: 2002, 2005, 2008, 2019, 2022
IHL Turner Cup
1/8 Finals: 1994–95, 1995–96, 1996–97, 1997–98
Quarterfinals: 1995–96 Western Conference Quarterfinals: 1997–98, 1998–99, 1999–2000, 2000–01
Semifinals (Western Conference): 1999–2000, 2000–01
Turner Cup Finals: 1999–2000, 2000–01
WNBA Playoffs
WNBA Eastern Conference Semifinals: 2013, 2014, 2015 WNBA Playoffs Second Round: 2016
WNBA Eastern Conference Finals: 2013, 2014 WNBA Semifinals: 2016

Professional wrestling

The Allstate Arena is the standard venue for WWE events in Chicago. For decades, WWE has brought Raw and SmackDown shows to the arena. Allstate Arena is also one of two venues (the other being Madison Square Garden) to host WrestleMania three times: namely the second segment of WrestleMania 2 in 1986, WrestleMania 13 in 1997, and WrestleMania 22 in 2006. WrestleMania 22 is also notable for being the last WrestleMania to date to be held in a smaller arena. Due to the event's rapid growth in popularity, from WrestleMania 23 at Detroit's Ford Field, the annual PPV has been held in large venues such as football stadiums.

The venue has also hosted The Wrestling Classic in 1985, two editions of Survivor Series (1989 and 2019), No Mercy 2007, Night of Champions 2010, Hell in a Cell 2022, two editions of Judgment Day (1998 and 2009), two editions of Extreme Rules (2012 and 2015), two editions of Backlash (2001 and 2017), two editions of Money in the Bank (2011 and 2018), three editions of Payback (2013, 2014 and 2016) and all three editions of NXT TakeOver: Chicago (2017, 2018 and 2019). 

When the arena was known as Rosemont Horizon, the venue hosted American Wrestling Association events in the Chicago area during the 1980s, replacing the International Amphitheatre. It also hosted WCW's Spring Stampede 1994. During the mid-1990s, Rosemont Horizon was the standard venue when WCW visited in Chicago; having replaced the UIC Pavilion, it was eventually dropped in favor of the United Center.

Concerts 

The arena has been the site of many concerts, including acts such as BTS, Taylor Swift, Scorpions, AC/DC, Tina Turner, Metallica, Andrea Bocelli, Green Day, Grateful Dead, Phish, My Chemical Romance, Marilyn Manson, Nine Inch Nails, Ricky Martin, Lorde, Foo Fighters, R.E.M., Justin Bieber, Queen, Rauw Alejandro and Trans-Siberian Orchestra.

Styx recorded their reunion live album "Return To Paradise" at the arena on September 21, 1996.

Gabriel Iglesias' Netflix special, "I'm Sorry for What I Said When I Was Hungry," was filmed at the arena in 2016.

Reagan-Bush rally

On November 4, 1984, Ronald Reagan and George H. W. Bush held a campaign rally in the Horizon, two days before the 1984 presidential election.

References

External links

Official Website
DePaul Athletics - Allstate Arena(web archive)

Allstate
American Basketball Association (2000–present) venues
Basketball venues in Illinois
Chicago Sky venues
Chicago Sting sports facilities
Chicago Wolves
Defunct college basketball venues in the United States
DePaul Blue Demons basketball venues
Event venues established in 1980
Indoor arenas in Illinois
Indoor ice hockey venues in Illinois
Indoor soccer venues in Illinois
Mixed martial arts venues in Illinois
Motorsport venues in Illinois
Music venues in Rosemont, Illinois
North American Soccer League (1968–1984) indoor venues
Rosemont, Illinois
Sports venues completed in 1980
Sports venues in Cook County, Illinois
World Hockey Association venues
Wrestling venues in Illinois
1980 establishments in Illinois
Loyola Ramblers basketball